Free So Free is the second studio album by alternative rock band J Mascis + The Fog. It was released in 2002. The album was recorded and mixed at "Bob's Place", Mascis's home studio in his native Amherst, Massachusetts.

Reception

Free So Free received mixed to positive reviews from critics. On Metacritic, the album holds a score of 72/100 based on 12 reviews, indicating "generally favorable reviews."

Track listing
All songs written by J Mascis.

Personnel
 J Mascis – vocals, electric and acoustic guitars, bass guitar, drums, mellotron
 Tony Jarvis – wurly (Tracks 2, 5)
 Don Depew – slide guitar (Tracks 2, 5), engineering
 Mark Klein – percussion (Track 7)
 John Petkovich – vocals (Tracks 3, 4, 6)
Technical
 Mark Allen Miller, Steve Revitte, Thom Monahan – engineering
 John Agnello – mixing

References

External links
Official J Mascis site

2002 albums
J Mascis + The Fog albums
City Slang albums
Pony Canyon albums